Naboløs 1 is a Neoclassical property situated at the corner of the streets Neboløs and Læderstrlde, close to Gammel Strand, in the Old Town of Copenhagen, Denmark. Together with the adjacent buildings at Naboløs 3 and Gammel Strand 52, it was constructed by Hans Christian Ondrup as part of the rebuilding of the city following the Copenhagen Fire of 1795. It was listed in the Danish registry of protected buildings and places in 1945.

History

18th century

The site was in the late 17th century part of a larger property, occupying the entire east side of the street Naboløs. The property was listed as No. 19 in Strand Quarter (Strand Kvarter) in Copenhagen's first cadastre of 1689. It was at that time owned by  Jørgen Ehlers, who is today mostly remembered for founding Elers' Kollegium in Store Kannikestræde. The property was again listed as No. 19 in the new cadastre of 1756. It was at that time owned by  post inspector Peter Bech.

At the time of the 1787 census, No. 19 was home to 25 residents in five households. Abraham Moses Henriques (1721–1802), a merchant (royal agent) and wallpaper manufacturer, resided in the building with his third wife Sara, their eight-year-old daughter, seven children from his second marriage (aged 13 to 21) and two maids. Johan Frederik Leth (1838–1918), a colonel lieutenant at the Zealand Regiment, resided in the building with his two children (aged five and 18), a male servant and two maids. Cay Hendrich Licht, a captain in the Norwegian Life Regiment, resided in the building with one servant and one maid. Jacob Adler, a junk dealer, resided in the building with his wife Chatrine Marie. Maria Cathrine Tykøv, widow of a gunmaker at the Royal Arsenal, resided in the building with her two daughters (aged 11 and 12).

The property was destroyed in the Copenhagen Fire of 1795, together with most of the other buildings in the area. The site was after the fire acquired by master builder Hans Christian Ondrup (1751–1814). He divided it into three separate properties. The building at the corner of Gammel Strand (No. 19A, now Gammel Strand 52) was constructed by him in 17961797. It was followed by No. 19B (now Naboløs 3 in 1798 and finally No. 19C at the corner with Læderstræde in 1798–1799.

19th century

The property was by 1801 owned by grocer (spækhøker) Rebecke Smith. She resided in one of the apartments with her two sons (aged 18 and 24) and a maid. The property was listed as No. 18 in the new cadastre of 1806. It was at that time still owned by Smith.

The property was by 1840 owned by Niels Hansen Øesterbye. He and his wife Abel Christine Hansen resided in the ground floor apartment to the left. Carl Frederik Axelsen, a saddlemaker at the Royal Artillery, resided in the ground floor apartment to the right with his wife Frederikke Andrea Andersen, their two children (aged two and four) and one lodger. Isael Salomonsen, a butcher (kjødudsælger), resided in the first floor apartment to the right with his wife Schanette Cohen, two daughters (aged 27 and 31) and one maid. Salomon Israel and Gutmann Cohen (aged 54 and 64), two junk dealers, resided in the first floor apartment to the left with one maid and one lodger. Marcus Behrendt Cohen, a junk dealer, resided in the second floor apartment to the left with his wife Sara Salomonsen, their two children (aged nine and 11), a 34-year-old niece and a maid.

Lars Malmgreen, a master building painter, resided on the third floor to the right with his wife Thala Chirstine Petersen, a 17-year-old apprentice and three lodgers. Ernst Techau, a master tailor, resided in the apartment on the second floor to the left with his wife Lovise Christine Wostmann and two children (aged two and seven). Jens Petersen, a fruit seller, resided in one of two basement dwellings (corner) with his wife Caren Elisabeth Winther	 and their two children (aged four and 14). Peter Martin Gøtz, a master shoemaker, resided in the other basement dwelling with his wife Marie Chrestine Hammer and their seven children (aged four to 16).

At the time of the 1845 census, No. 18 was home to 56 residents. Hans Hansen, a former farmer, was now residing in one of the ground floor apartments with his wife Eline Sophie Hansen, their three children (aged two to six), the wife's mother and a maid. Daniel Holst, a master shoemaker, resided in the other ground floor apartment with his wife Kirstine Marie Bertelsen, their two sons (aged 13 and 17) and one lodger. The now retired junk dealer Salomon Israel Salmonsen	was still residing in one of the two first floor apartments. Niels Madsen Høybye, a hatter, resided in the other first floor apartment with his wife Conradine Nielsen, their two children (aged nine and 13) and six lodgers. The junk dealer Marcus Bernt Cohn was still residing on the second floor with his family and lodgers. Carl August Hamberg, a master painter, resided in one of the third floor apartments with his wife Eline Cathrine Agerbundsen, their one-year-old so and, Hamberg's mother Cathrine Hamberg. Kirstine Marie Møller, a 63-year-old widow employed with needlework, resided in the other third floor apartment with her 31-year-old daughter and four lodgers. The residents of the basement included the master shoemaker from the 1840 census, a bookprinter and a hatter.

At the time of the 1860 census, No. 18 was home to 43 residents.

At the time of the 1880 census, Naboløs 1 was home to 39 residents. Jens Arten Jessen, a clothing retailer, resided in one of the ground floor apartments with his wife Alma Mariette Nathalie Jessen and 19-year-old niece Dagmar Christensen. Carl August Gother, a glazier, resided in the other ground floor apartment with his wife Nathalie Vilhelmine Gother and their two children (aged 10 and 13). Christen Svendsen, a grain merchant, resided in one of the first floor apartments with his wife Inger Christine Svendsen and their two children (aged 11 and 20). Carl Vilhelm Salomon, a retailer, resided in the other first floor apartment with his wife Oline Hansen Salomon and the clerk Julius Sophus T. Myller. Isak Jacob Jacobsen, a master craftsman, resided on the second floor with his wife Elna Axeline Jacobsen, their 11-year-old son Axel Jacob Jacobsen, one maid, Isak Salomonsen and Salomonsen's three sisters. Lars Christiansen, a workman, resided in the basement with his wife Bertha Christiansen, their daughter and one maid. Christoffer Petersen, a woodware retailer, resided in the basement with his wife Anna Marie Petersen and their four children (aged seven to 20).

Architecture

The building is constructed with four storeys over a walk-out basement. The building has a six-bays-long facade on Læderstræde. a seven-bays-long facade on Naboløs and a chamfered corner. The chamfered corner bay was dictated for all corner buildings by Jørgen Henrich Rawert's and Peter Meyn's guidelines for the rebuilding of the city after the fire so that the fire department's long ladder companies could navigate the streets more easily. A side wing extends from the rear side of the Naboløs wing along the south side of a small central courtyard. The dressed facade is finished with a belt course and a cornice. The main entrance in Naboløs is topped by a transom window with a wooden cartouche. The red tile roof features six dormer windows towards the street and four towards the yard. The roof ridge is pierced by two chimneys. The side wing has a monopitched mansard roof.

Today
The building contains two shops on the ground floor, one shop in the basement and eight condominiums (E/F Naboløs 1) on the upper floors.

References 

Listed residential buildings in Copenhagen
Residential buildings completed in 1799